Gentle Julia is a 1922 novel by the American writer Booth Tarkington.

Film adaptations
The novel has twice been adapted:
 Gentle Julia, a silent film directed by Rowland V. Lee
 Gentle Julia, a sound film directed by John G. Blystone

References

Bibliography
 Goble, Alan. The Complete Index to Literary Sources in Film. Walter de Gruyter, 1999.

External links
 

Novels by Booth Tarkington
1922 American novels
American novels adapted into films
American romance novels